High Technology High School (HTHS), founded in 1991, is a four-year magnet public high school for students in ninth through twelfth grades, located in the Lincroft section of Middletown Township, in Monmouth County, United States, operated as a cooperative effort between the Monmouth County Vocational School District (MCVSD) and Brookdale Community College.  It is a pre-engineering academy, offering courses such as Introduction to Engineering and Design, Computer Integrated Manufacturing, and Principles of Engineering. It is a member of the National Consortium for Specialized Secondary Schools of Mathematics, Science and Technology. The school has been accredited by the Middle States Association of Colleges and Schools Commission on Elementary and Secondary Schools since 1995.

In its listing of "America's Best High Schools 2016", the school was ranked 20th out of 500 best high schools in the country; it was ranked seventh among all high schools in New Jersey. In its 2013 report on "America's Best High Schools", The Daily Beast ranked the school 16th in the nation among participating public high schools and first among schools in New Jersey. According to 2011 Newsweek statistics, High Technology High School students registered an average SAT score of 2145, the highest of any U.S. high school; overall, Newsweek ranked HTHS 18th nationally and the top high school in New Jersey. In 2011, HTHS was ranked Number 1 for Best High Schools for Math & Science in U.S. News & World Report, and in 2013, the school was ranked the twelfth best high school overall in the United States by U.S. News. In its 2015 rankings, Niche.com, Inc. ranked High Technology High School the best public high school in America.

As of the 2021–22 school year, the school had an enrollment of 287 students and 22.5 classroom teachers (on an FTE basis), for a student–teacher ratio of 12.8:1. There were 2 students (0.7% of enrollment) eligible for free lunch and 2 (0.7% of students) eligible for reduced-cost lunch.

History
The school opened its doors in 1991 with a sophomore class of 62 students in facilities on the campus of Brookdale Community College, with plans to add a new grade each year to accommodate grades 10–12.

The school building on the Brookdale campus was completed in 1992 and an expansion two years later allowed the school to double enrollment. A freshman class was added in fall 1995. The student population is kept relatively small, with typically 65-80 students per class year, allowing the school to maintain a low student–teacher ratio.

Awards and recognition
Business Insider ranked High Technology High School at the top of its 2014 list of the "25 best public high school in the United States".
For the 2003–04 school year, High Technology High School received the National Blue Ribbon Award from the United States Department of Education for the second time, the highest honor that an American school can achieve.
High Technology High School was twice named a "Star School" by the New Jersey Department of Education, the highest form of recognition for a New Jersey school, in both 1994-95 and 2001–02.
High Technology High School was recognized by Newsweek magazine in its May 28, 2007 issue covering America's Best High Schools, as one of its 21 Public Elites, a group of consistent high performers excluded from its rankings because of the number of students with SAT (or ACT) scores well above the national average.
HTHS was cited as a "Public Elite", one of 22 such schools recognized nationwide in Newsweek magazine's listing of "America's Best High Schools" in the May 8, 2006 issue. Newsweek described the school as "A pre-engineering academy with topnotch humanities"
HTHS was ranked as Number 7 in U.S. News & World Report's listing of "America's Best High Schools" in 2008.

Academics

High Technology offers a full high school education, with emphasis on math, science, and technology. Students take college courses during their junior and senior years, and seniors are required to take a mentorship course for one semester.

Class scheduling works around "block" scheduling. All classes are 71 minutes long, and there are 5 periods in a day. All students eat lunch at the same time, between 11:00 and 12:00 PM. Most classes are held three times a week. Physical Education is held two periods per week. AP science classes have "double labs" which are two periods (138 minutes) long, while AP Calculus classes meet one extra period per week. The foreign languages taught at High Technology High School are Latin, French, and Spanish. Junior and senior technology electives - Project Lead the Way courses (Digital Electronics, Civil Engineering and Architecture, Biological Engineering & Environmental Sustainability, Computer Science & Software Engineering, and Engineering Design and Development) - are held three times a week for two periods (138 minutes).

Other career academies
There are four other career academies / sister schools in the Monmouth County Vocational School District. The other schools (with 2020–21 enrollment data) are:
 Academy of Allied Health & Science (AAHS) in Neptune Township (306 students; in grades 9–12)
 Biotechnology High School (BTHS) in Freehold Borough (315; 9–12)
 Communications High School (CHS) in Wall Township (306; 9–12)
 Marine Academy of Science and Technology (MAST) in Sandy Hook in Middletown Township (283; 9–12)

Extracurricular activities

High Technology High School offers a variety of clubs including:
Academic Team
Book Club
Chess Club
Computer Club
American Computer Science League
Creative Arts Club
Environmental Club
Experimental Research Group
Finance Club
MIT Launch
Fed Challenge Team
Euro Challenge Team
Genders and Sexualities Alliance
Key Club
Math League
National History Bee and Bowl
National Honor Society
Wellness Club
Steminist Club
Newspaper Club
Performing Arts Club
Drama
Jazz Band
Ping Pong Club
Robotics and Coding Club
cypHER
VEX Robotics
Science Bowl
Science Leagues (Biology, Physics I, Physics II, Physics C, Chemistry, Environmental Science)
Debate Club
Student Government Association
Technology Student Association
Various religious interest groups
Yearbook

Notable alumni
 Brian Christian (born 1984, class of 2002), author of "The Most Human Human" and "Algorithms to Live By".
 Akash Modi (born 1995, class of 2013), artistic gymnast who represented the United States at the 2018 World Artistic Gymnastics Championships.
 Julie Shah (born 1982, class of 2000), MIT Professor named one of the world's top 35 innovators under 35.

References

External links
High Technology High School (official site)
Monmouth County Vocational School District

School Data for the High Technology High School, National Center for Education Statistics

1991 establishments in New Jersey
Educational institutions established in 1991
Magnet schools in New Jersey
Middletown Township, New Jersey
Monmouth County Vocational School District School
NCSSS schools
Public high schools in Monmouth County, New Jersey